Xələc or Khalandzh or Khaladzh may refer to:
Khalaj, Armenia
Əhmədli, Beylagan, Azerbaijan
Parça Xələc, Azerbaijan
Xələc, Khizi, Azerbaijan
Xələc, Nakhchivan, Azerbaijan
Xələc, Qubadli, Azerbaijan
Xələc, Salyan, Azerbaijan
Xələc, Ujar, Azerbaijan